David J. Hughes is an American railroad executive.

Hughes has worked in the railroad industry for more than 30 years and was a member of Amtrak's senior management since 2002, serving as the company's Chief Engineer under President David L. Gunn.

The decision by Amtrak's Board of Directors to fire Gunn on November 9, 2005, saw Hughes named the interim President and Chief Executive Officer until a permanent replacement could be recruited.

Hughes was replaced by Alexander Kummant on August 29, 2006.

See also
 List of railroad executives

References

 11/15/05 - Testimony of David Hughes before the Subcommittee on Railroads of the House Transportation and Infrastructure Committee

Year of birth missing (living people)
Living people
Amtrak presidents
21st-century American railroad executives